Bella Ratchinskaia (born in Vorkuta (Russia) on 22 November 1953) is a classical ballet choreographer and maÎtre de ballet. She attended and graduated with honours at the State Academy of Ballet in Perm. After her studies, she joined the USSR "All-Union Contest" for young dancers and moved to Leningrad (San Petersburg) where she started a classical dance career at the Theatre. In 1972  she began to work as a principal dancer in the company "Choreographical Miniatures" directed by Leonid Yakobson, she performed all roles of the classical repertory and Yakobson's own choreographic creations. She enjoyed critical acclaim during international tours for her interpretation of these roles.

In 1976, she took her first steps in creating her own choreography. The approval she received from the Soviet public encouraged her to follow a pedagogical and choreographic career. In the same year she began the renowned Teachers course at The Vaganova Ballet Academy. After graduation with honours and receiving the official title of Pedagogue for Classical, Historical, Character Ballet and Repertoire she began teaching at the Vaganova Academy. During the years while working in the  Vaganova Academy of Russian Ballet, another important field of activity was a close collaboration with the Ministry of Culture of Mongolia, developing educational methods for the training of classical ballet for both students and teachers. Her professional  success, was rewarded, in 1989, with the 'Honorary Board and Symbol of Ministry of Culture' of the USSR and Mongolia.  At the end of '80s, the Academy initiated international cultural exchanges, among others with Italy, and in 1990 Bella Ratchinskaia was engaged as maÎtre de ballet at Milan's La Scala Theatre and as pedagogue for classical, historical and repertoire  at La Scala Ballet Academy directed by Anna Maria Prina. Together with Giuseppe Carbone (director of the La Scala ballet company ),  she started  "MaÎtre de ballet education course" with the objective of giving classical dancers ending their stage-career, a professional teaching qualification.

In the second half of the 1990s, she actively collaborated with theatres and international companies as a training and rehearsal maÎtre for classical ballet also staging her own choreographic productions; in 1996 she produced Ballet Class for Sarasota Ballet Company  (Florida, USA) directed by Robert de Warren.  Between 1997 and '98 she created numerous classic and demi-charactére choreographic works for Teatro Carcano (Milan, Italy), in '99 she worked as a guest with Compagnia de la Comunidad de Madrid (Spain) under the direction of Victor Ullate.  In the same year she worked on "Sleeping Beauty" Ballet for the Hungarian State Opera (ballet company directed by Gyula Harangozo ).

After the years working at La Scala under the direction of  Robert de Warren, Giuseppe Carbone and Elisabetta Terabust,  she moved to Vienna (Austria), where she worked from 1999 to 2003 as maître de ballet and rehearsal assistant for the classical repertoire at the Vienna State Opera, company directed by Renato Zanella. In 2002 and 2003 respectively, she cooperated and created choreographies for the "Nacht des Ballets" Gala and  "Fanny Elssler" Gala (Eisenstadt, Austria), in the same year she worked as guest at the Dutch National Ballet Company (Amsterdam, Nederlands).

Between 2004 and 2011 she renewed her professional collaboration in Italy;  initially with the Opera and Ballet Academy of Rome  (respectively under the direction of Carla Fracci and Paola Jorio)  and then with the Ballet Academy "La Scala" in Milan. She was always ready for opportunities to choreograph classical and demi-charactére creations, and in 2007, for the Ballet Academy of Rome Opera, she  produced a ballet using the Russian folklore music the "Balaljka Magica", and in the next year on Giuseppe Verdi's music "Vespri Siciliani" a ballet called Colombine and Pulcinella.

Since 2012 she has worked at the Vienna State Opera Theatre and Academy. In collaboration with the Ballet Academy Director Simona Noja she created choreographies for academy students; in 2013 using Karen Chatschaturjan's music she produced the ballet in two acts Cipollino and in 2014 she presented on the opera stage Frühling in Wien, in 2015 „Avant-Scéne“ a composite work   on Offenbach/Anderson/Arbeau and Strauss musik, in 2015 a new revival of „Chopiniana“. With the Vienna State Opera Ballet Company, under Manuel Legris direction, she realized for Nurejew Gala (Vienna's State Opera traditional ballet event which concludes the artistic theatre season) in 2012 "Laurencia" and in 2014 "Paquita". 
Since 1997 Bella Ratchinskaia is an honorary  patron of the "Russian Ballet Association" with headquarters in Switzerland and representatives  in England, Japan and Italy. She acted as a member and chairman of juries during International Competitions in Austria, Italy, Switzerland.  For her contribution to the Arts she was honored in 2001 with the "Crisalide" award and then with the Petruzzelli award.

References

External links
 https://web.archive.org/web/20150924135147/http://www.teatro.it/rubriche/interviste/ratchinskaia_la_farfalla_che_insegna_a_volare_ai_ballerini_319

Russian Ballet Association:  https://web.archive.org/web/20140814170855/http://www.balletcenter.ch/de/default.html?id=24
 http://www.opera-balletschool.com/?page_id=33
 http://www.wiener-staatsoper.at/Content.Node/home/spielplan/Spielplandetail.en.php?eventid=1454860
 http://giornaledelladanza.com/home/2016/10/la-danza-e-un-regalo-di-dio-intervista-a-bella-ratchinskaja-esclusiva/

Russian ballerinas
Russian choreographers
Ballet teachers
1953 births
Living people
People from Vorkuta